Rigo Central Rural LLG is a local-level government (LLG) of Central Province, Papua New Guinea.

Wards
01. Manugoro
02. Girabu
03. Gobuia
04. Gomore
05. Babaga (Saroa)
06. Kemaea
07. Kwalimurubu
08. Gidobada
09. Saroa
10. Kodogere
11. Geresi
12. Wasira
13. Kwikila Town
14. Imuagoro
15. Saroakeina
16. Sivitatana
17. Boregaina
18. Daroakomana
19. Bigairuka
20. Bore
21. Goulupu
22. Niuiruka
23. Rigo Koiari Iove
24. Karekodobu
25. Kware
26. Gaunomu
27. Nafenanomu
28. Dirinimu
29. Kore
29. Kwaipo
30. Mamalo
81. Kwikila Urban

References

Local-level governments of Central Province (Papua New Guinea)